La Vega may refer to:

Places
 La Vega (city), or Concepción de La Vega, the third largest city and municipality of the Dominican Republic
 La Vega Province, a province in central Dominican Republic named for the city of La Vega
 La Vega, Cauca, a town and municipality in Colombia
 La Vega, Cundinamarca, a town and municipality in Colombia
 A Veiga, a Galician town whose Castilian name is La Vega
 La Vega, capital of the municipality of Vega de Liébana

Music
 La Vega, a piano work by Isaac Albéniz, written in 1899
 Fiel a la Vega, a Rock en Español band from Puerto Rico formed in 1994
 Viva La Vega, a Norwegian DVD of the band Kaizers Orchestra

Other uses
 La Vega Central Market, also known simply as "La Vega", in Santiago, Chile
 La Vega Independent School District, a public school district in Waco, Texas, USA
 Pietro la Vega (1764–1810), Italian artist

See also
De la Vega (disambiguation)
Las Vegas (disambiguation)
Vegas (disambiguation)